<mapframe
text="Navy Board Inlet"
width=242
height=242
zoom=5
latitude=73
longitude=-79
type="line"
stroke-width=3
id="Q6982611" />
Navy Board Inlet is a body of water in Nunavut's Qikiqtaaluk Region. It is an arm of Lancaster Sound, after which it proceeds southerly before it empties into Eclipse Sound.

The inlet separates Baffin Island to the west from Bylot Island to the east, making it part of the Sirmilik National Park.  There are a few islands within Navy Board Inlet, including the Wollaston Islands.

History
Navy Board Inlet was first discovered by Admiral Sir Edward Parry in 1819.

In literature
Navy Board Inlet is the setting for Rudyard Kipling's story "Quiquern", in The Second Jungle Book.

References

External links
 Photos: 
Cruise ship within the inlet
Sky above the inlet 
Glaciers draining into the inlet

Inlets of Baffin Island